Đaković (Cyrillic: Ђаковић; also transliterated Djaković) is a surname. Notable people with the surname include:

 Dario Đaković (born 1987), Austrian footballer
 Đuro Đaković (1886–1929), Yugoslav politician
 Isaija Đaković (1635-1708), Metropolitan of Krušedol

See also
 Đakovica
 Đakovo
 Đoković

Croatian surnames
Serbian surnames